"FMS" (stylized as "FM$", Freak My Shit) is the sixth and final single by American hip hop duo New Boyz. It was released as a single on April 13, 2012, and was included on the mixtape, Foolie Tape (2012). The track was produced by Legacy.

Music video
A music video for the song was released on May 7, 2012.

Track listing
Digital download (Explicit version)
"Fm$" – 3:01

Digital download (Clean version)
"Fm$" – 3:01

Charts

References

External links
 

2012 songs
2012 singles
New Boyz songs
Warner Records singles